Vidradnyi is a neighbourhood in Kyiv, Ukraine. It belongs to Solomianskyi Raion (district) of Kyiv. 

The name Vidradnyi is derived from the khutor with the same name, that has been one of the Kyiv's suburbs in the beginning of the 20th century. 

Neighborhoods in Kyiv
Solomianskyi District